James Randel "Randy" Matson (born March 5, 1945) is an American track and field athlete who mostly competed in the shot put. Matson won a silver medal at the 1964 and a gold medal at the 1968 Olympics.

Early years
The son of Charles and Ellen Matson, Randy Matson was reared in Pampa, the seat of Gray County in the Texas Panhandle. At the age of twelve, he participated in his first track meet.  He won the 50-yard dash, the 100-yard dash, the long jump and the high jump and finished sixth in the shot put.  He attended Pampa High School, where he was a three-sport standout in American football, basketball, and track and field.  He won All-District football honors, and was a two-time All-District and one-time All-State basketball player, averaging 15 points per game.  In track and field, he was a two-time State Champion in both the shot put and the discus and could run the 100 yard dash in 10.2 seconds.  This led him to be named an All-State and All-American in track and field. He was Track and Field News "High School Athlete of the Year" in 1963. Matson was also named Track and Field News' Men's Athlete of the Year in 1970.

Amateur career
Matson is one of the greatest shot putters in the history of the sport, based predominantly on his one meter improvement of the world record in 1965.  He attended Texas A&M University, where he continued to work on his shot put skills, and in his first full year of using the heavier college (adult or Senior) shot (16 pounds), Matson won the Olympic Silver Medal in the 1964 Tokyo Olympics.

From 1965 through 1971, Matson entered 79 competitions, winning 73. During this time he had a considerable rivalry with Neal Steinhauer, but usually came out on top.

Matson earned his BBA in marketing from Texas A&M in 1967. He was selected in the 5th round (120th pick overall) by the Atlanta Falcons of the National Football League, and the 11th round (122nd overall) by the Seattle SuperSonics of the National Basketball Association. Matson turned down both opportunities to concentrate on track and field.

He earned the Olympic Gold Medal at the Mexico City Games in 1968, and was named the 1970 Track and Field News Athlete of the Year. He was on the June 1970 and January 1971 covers of Track and Field News.

In 1967 he threw the discus to within three inches (8 cm) of the (then) world record, and was briefly considered as a possible double Olympic champion in shot and discus—like Bud Houser in 1924—but Matson only competed in the shot in Mexico City. On that same day Matson put the shot over 70 feet three times and the discus over 200 feet three times.

He narrowly missed making the 1972 Olympic team when he finished fourth at the Olympic Trials. Matson retired after that contest as the only man who, up to that time, had ever put the shot over 70 feet.  He was inducted into the Texas A&M Hall of Fame in 1972, the Texas Sports Hall of Fame in 1974, the National Sports Hall of Fame in 1981, the National Track and Field Hall of Fame in 1984, the National High School Sports Hall of Fame in 1988 and the Texas Track and Field Coaches Hall of Fame in 2012.

Career highlights
 Personal Record: 
 Olympic Gold Medal, 1968: 
 Olympic Silver Medal, 1964: 
 US National Champion in 1964, 1966, 1967, 1968, 1970, and 1972
 NCAA Shot Put Champion 1966 and 1967
 NCAA Discus Champion 1966 and 1967
 Broke Shot Put World Record four times – annual bests for those years:
 1965: 
 1967:

Post-retirement
Matson has dedicated his post-sports career to Texas A&M University.  He joined The Association of Former Students in 1972, and served as their executive director from 1979 until his retirement in 1999; he was subsequently honored to be chosen the keynote speaker for the 2000 Aggie Muster held on the A&M campus.

In 2003, the Texas A&M Foundation created the post of Senior Philanthropic Officer for him.  Once the foundation had completed its One Spirit One Vision fundraising campaign in 2007, far exceeding its goal, Matson announced his resignation.  He had suffered from heart trouble in 2004 and wished to spend more time with his six young grandchildren.

Matson is married to the former Margaret Burns, a 1966 graduate of Abilene Christian University, where she served as a cheerleader.  They have three children, Jessica, who is married to Russell Camp of Amarillo, Jim, and Cole, all of whom graduated from Texas A&M. Matson and his family live in College Station, Texas.

References

External links
 
 
 
 
 

1945 births
Living people
American male shot putters
Athletes (track and field) at the 1964 Summer Olympics
Athletes (track and field) at the 1967 Pan American Games
Athletes (track and field) at the 1968 Summer Olympics
Texas A&M Aggies men's basketball players
Texas A&M Aggies men's track and field athletes
Olympic gold medalists for the United States in track and field
Olympic silver medalists for the United States in track and field
People from Pampa, Texas
World record setters in athletics (track and field)
Seattle SuperSonics draft picks
Track and field athletes from Texas
People from Kilgore, Texas
James E. Sullivan Award recipients
Medalists at the 1968 Summer Olympics
Medalists at the 1964 Summer Olympics
Pan American Games gold medalists for the United States
Pan American Games medalists in athletics (track and field)
Universiade medalists in athletics (track and field)
American men's basketball players
Track & Field News Athlete of the Year winners
Universiade gold medalists for the United States
Medalists at the 1965 Summer Universiade
Medalists at the 1967 Pan American Games